The 2021 Austin Peay Governors football team represented Austin Peay State University during the 2021 NCAA Division I FCS football season as a member of the Ohio Valley Conference (OVC). They were led by second-year head coach Scotty Walden and played their games at Fortera Stadium in Clarksville, Tennessee.

Schedule

Source:

References

Austin Peay
Austin Peay Governors football seasons
Austin Peay Governors football